is a passenger railway station in located in the city of Toba,  Mie Prefecture, Japan, operated by the private railway operator Kintetsu Railway.

Lines
Ikenoura Station is served by the Toba Line, and is located 38.9 rail kilometers from the terminus of the line at Ise-Nakagawa Station.

Station layout
The station was consists of two opposed side platforms built on an embankment. There is no station building, and the station is unattended.

Platforms

Adjacent stations

History
Ikenoura Station opened on March 1, 1970. The station is unattended, and has used PiTaPa automated wicket gates since April 1, 2007.

Passenger statistics
In fiscal 2019, the station was used by an average of 473 passengers daily (boarding passengers only).

Surrounding area
Toba National College of Maritime Technology
Japan National Route 42

See also
List of railway stations in Japan

References

External links

Kintetsu: Ikenoura Station 

Railway stations in Japan opened in 1970
Railway stations in Mie Prefecture
Stations of Kintetsu Railway
Toba, Mie